Texier was a French sailor who represented his country at the 1900 Summer Olympics in Meulan, France. With Texier (helmsman) as helmsman and fellow crewmembers Jean-Baptiste Charcot and Robert Linzeler, Texier took the 2nd place in first race of the 0 to 0.5 ton and finished 2nd in the second race. With Texier (helmsman) he finished 8th in the 0.5 to 1 ton. Also with Texier (helmsman) he took part in the 1 to 2 ton. They finished 7th in the first race and 6th in the second race.

Further reading

References

External links

French male sailors (sport)
Sailors at the 1900 Summer Olympics – 0 to .5 ton
Sailors at the 1900 Summer Olympics – .5 to 1 ton
Sailors at the 1900 Summer Olympics – 1 to 2 ton
Sailors at the 1900 Summer Olympics – Open class
Olympic sailors of France
Year of birth missing
Year of death missing
Olympic silver medalists for France
Sailors at the 1900 Summer Olympics – 3 to 10 ton
Olympic medalists in sailing
Place of birth missing
Place of death missing
Missing middle or first names